Tillie Anderson (April 23, 1875 – April 29, 1965) was a road and track cyclist.  Tillie, a Swedish immigrant and, from all accounts, an extremely strong-willed individual, outpaced the best of the best on the wheel, with times that are still impressive today.  Born in Skåne, Sweden in 1875, Tillie emigrated to Chicago in 1891 at the age of 16.  At 18, she had saved enough money working as a seamstress to buy her first bicycle.  During the summer of 1895, she took part in the race over the Elgin-Aurora (Ill.) century course and broke the century record.  She later traveled around the country taking part in six-day bicycle races for women, which involved racing at top speed two hours each evening for six consecutive days.  Tillie was 20 years old when the League of American Wheelmen recognized her as the best woman cyclist in the world.  In June 2000 – 105 years later - Tillie was posthumously inducted into the  United States Bicycling Hall of Fame , an undisputed champion and a true pioneer in women's athletics.

Record-holder
Anderson held records for practically every distance from sprinting to endurance.  She once rode a half-mile in 52 seconds; on another occasion she rode 100 miles in six hours, 52 minutes and 15 seconds.  She is reported to have entered 130 races in her career and was first over the finish mark in all but seven races.  She remained the unofficial Champion of the World until retiring in 1902, when women were barred from racing due in part to the level of danger involved in the sport and the suppression of women in sports.

"The women themselves admit that they will physically break down, but they are determined to race for the money they win".  — The St. Louis Republic, December 12, 1897

Marriage

At the height of her career, Tillie Anderson married her trainer and manager, J. P. "Phil" Sjöberg, in December 1897.  Phil, a former racer himself, gave up his racing career to manage Tillie's.  Race managers trained their athletes, found sponsors to pay expenses, scheduled races and didn't let go at the starting line until they had given their cyclist the strongest push they could muster.  Sjöberg developed tuberculosis shortly after their marriage and died in 1901.  Tillie, widowed at age 26, never remarried.

Pioneering career
Many people - including Tillie's mother, brother, and her Bible teacher Reverend Dwight L. Moody - disapproved of women (especially Tillie) riding bicycles, not to mention competing in racing events wearing tight fitting clothing and where gambling was known to have occurred.  But others felt differently.  In 1896, Susan B. Anthony was quoted as saying, "Let me tell you what I think of bicycling.  It has done more to emancipate women than anything else in the world.  It gives a woman a feeling of freedom and self-reliance.  I stand by and rejoice every time I see a woman ride by on a wheel...the picture of free, untrammeled womanhood".  When Anthony was quoted as saying this in 1896, Tillie Anderson was the undisputed ladies' cycling champion of the world, and had been for over a year.

Legacy
Tillie remained an advocate for bicycling through the years and often boasted about keeping within four pounds of her racing weight throughout her life.  Tillie served as an advocate for the development of bicycle paths in Chicago's city parks.  She remained active in the League of American Wheelman and the Bicycle Stars of the Nineteenth Century organizations until her death in 1965 at the age of 90. For her achievements in cycling in both road and track events, Anderson was inducted into the United States Bicycling Hall of Fame in 2000.

Personal life

 Born April 23, 1875, Skåne, Sweden, to Anders Bengtsson and Sara Ann-Marie Nilsdotter 
 Immigrated to Chicago, IL, in 1891
 Married J.P. "Phil" Shoberg (Sjöberg) in December 1897.  Shoberg passed away from difficulties with tuberculosis in February 1902 (Los Angeles, CA). Buried in Evergreen Cemetery, Los Angeles, CA  
 Died April 29, 1965 (age 90), Detroit Lakes, Minnesota.  Buried in Immanuel Lutheran Church cemetery, Osage, Minnesota

References

Further reading

External links
 Gilles, Roger. 2018. "Women on the Move - The Forgotten Era of Women's Bicycle Racing". University of Nebraska Press.
 Stauffacher, Sue. 2011. "Tillie the Terrible Swede." New York: Alfred A. Knopf. 
 www.tillieanderson.com 
 Rapha presents Tillie 

1875 births
1965 deaths
American female cyclists
People from Skåne County
Swedish emigrants to the United States
Swedish female cyclists